In military terms, 4th Division may refer to:

Infantry divisions 
4th (Quetta) Division, British Indian Army
4th Alpine Division Cuneense, Italy
4th Blackshirt Division (3 January), Italy
4th Canadian Division
4th Division (Australia)
4th Division (Estonia)
4th Division (German Empire)
4th Division (Imperial Japanese Army)
4th Division (Iraq)
4th Division (Japan)
4th Division (New Zealand)
4th Division (North Korea)
4th Division (Norway), participated in the Norwegian Campaign
4th Division (Reichswehr)
4th Guards Motor Rifle Division (Soviet Union)
4th Guards Rifle Division (Soviet Union)
4th Infantry Division (Belgium), Belgian Army order of battle (1914)
4th Infantry Division (Greece)
4th Infantry Division (India)
4th Infantry Division (Philippines)
4th Infantry Division (Poland)
4th Infantry Division (Romania)
4th Infantry Division (Russian Empire)
4th Infantry Division (Thailand)
4th Infantry Division (United Kingdom)
4th Infantry Division (United States)
4th Infantry Division (Wehrmacht)
4th Infantry Division Littorio, Italy
4th Infantry Division Livorno
4th Luftwaffe Field Division (Germany)
4th Marine Division (United States)
4th Motor Rifle Division (Soviet Union)
4th Motorized Infantry Division (People's Republic of China)
4th Mountain Division (Wehrmacht)
4th Panzergrenadier Division (Bundeswehr)
4th Rifle Division (Soviet Union)
4th Royal Bavarian Division
4th SS Polizei Panzergrenadier Division, Germany
Finnish 4th Division (Winter War)

Cavalry divisions 
4th Light Cavalry Division (France)
4th Cavalry Division (German Empire)
9th Panzer Division (Wehrmacht), originally the 4th Light Division
1st Indian Cavalry Division, designated 4th Cavalry Division from November 1916 to March 1918 in France in World War I
4th Cavalry Division (India), British Indian Army
4th Cavalry Division (Russian Empire)
4th Mounted Division, United Kingdom

Armoured divisions 
4th Canadian Division
4th Armoured Division (Egypt)
4th Armoured Division (France, 1964)
4th Armored Division (France, 1940)
4th Panzer Division (Wehrmacht)
4th Tank Division (Imperial Japanese Army)
4th Guards Tank Division, Russia
4th Armoured Division (Syria)
4th Infantry Division (United Kingdom) - an armoured division in the 1980s
4th Armored Division (United States)

Aviation divisions 
4th Fighter Aviation Division (People's Liberation Army Air Force), China
4th Air Division (Germany)
4th Fighter Division (Germany)
4th Air Division, United States

Other divisions 
4th Parachute Division (Germany)
4th Guards Airborne Division (Soviet Union)
4th Anti-Aircraft Artillery Division (Soviet Union)
4th Guards Anti-Aircraft Artillery Division (Soviet Union)
4th Army Division, Sweden
4th Airborne Division, United Kingdom deception formation
4th Anti-Aircraft Division (United Kingdom)